Reginald Van Brown (born March 12, 1960) is a former American football running back and coach. He played in the National Football League for the Atlanta Falcons and Philadelphia Eagles, and in the original USFL for the Los Angeles Express and Arizona Outlaws. He was the running backs coach for the 2003 Berlin Thunder. He played college football for the Oregon Ducks.

References

1960 births
Living people
American football running backs
Atlanta Falcons players
Philadelphia Eagles players
Arizona Outlaws players
Oregon Ducks football players

Malcolm X Shabazz High School alumni
Los Angeles Express players
University of Oregon alumni